Yugoslavia men's national water polo team was the national water polo team that represented the Kingdom of Serbs, Croats and Slovenes (1920–1929), the Kingdom of Yugoslavia (1929–1941) and the Federal Yugoslavia (1946–1992). They were one of strongest waterpolo teams in history of sport, having won 7 Olympic, 4 World Championship, 5 World Cup and 13 European Championship medals.

Olympic Games record

World Championship record

World Cup record

European Championship record

Player statistics

Most appearances
100+

Top scorers
200+

See also
 Yugoslavia men's Olympic water polo team records and statistics
 List of Olympic champions in men's water polo
 List of men's Olympic water polo tournament records and statistics
 List of world champions in men's water polo

References

Men's national water polo teams
 
Men's sport in Yugoslavia